Usman Amodu (born 16 December 1990) is a Nigerian footballer who played for the Nigeria national football team and club sides such as Llaneros F.C. in Colombia. His position is defender.

National team 
Amodu played in the squad that won the 2007 African Under-17 Championship and the 2007 FIFA U-17 World Cup, where Nigeria obtained its third title. Amodu played three matches during all the tournament.

Titles

References 

Nigerian expatriate footballers
Nigerian footballers
1990 births
Living people
Expatriate footballers in Colombia
Llaneros F.C. players
Al-Hilal Club (Omdurman) players
Nigeria under-20 international footballers
Place of birth missing (living people)
Association football defenders
Abuja F.C. players